Climate Alliance is a European network of cities, towns and counties founded in 1990 committed to the protection of the world's climate. The European Secretariat of Climate Alliance is based in Frankfurt am Main, Germany and in Brussels, Belgium. Climate Alliance has members in Austria, Belarus, Belgium, Bulgaria, Croatia, Czech Republic, Denmark, Finland,d, France, Georgia, Germany, Hungary, Ireland, Italy, Luxembourg, North Macedonia, Netherlands, Peru, Poland, Portugal, Romania, Slovakia, Slovenia, Spain, Sweden, Switzerland and Ukraine.

Purpose and aims
The nearly 2,000 members from more than 25 European countries aim to reduce greenhouse gas emissions at their source. Their allies are the indigenous peoples of the rainforests. The indigenous partners are represented by COICA, the Coordination of Indigenous Organisations of the nine neighbouring countries of the Amazon Basin.

By joining Climate Alliance, cities and municipalities embrace the association's goals:

 To strive for a 95 percent reduction in greenhouse gas emissions by 2050 compared to 1990 levels, in line with IPCC recommendations.
 To implement effective and comprehensive climate action in accordance with Climate Alliance principles.
 To promote climate justice together with indigenous peoples by supporting their rights, protecting biodiversity and abstaining from the use of unsustainably managed timber.

Foundation pillars of local climate protection are energy savings and efficient energy use as well as renewable energy sources and environment-friendly mobility. Climate Alliance advises cities and municipalities on the implementation of climate protection strategies and develops recognised tools for standardised recording of energy consumption and  emissions. Furthermore, Climate Alliance develops and coordinates projects and campaigns, which address different target groups. Besides of own activities Climate Alliance is partner of further campaigns and steps also into political actions. On national and international level it stands up for European local authorities engaged in climate protection and supports organisations of Indigenous peoples.

External links 
 Homepage of Climate Alliance: English and German
 Campaign: ZOOM – Kids on the Move
 Local Authorities acting for the MDGs — Europe for more development
 Energy and CO2 Monitoring
 The Covenant of Mayors
 Alleanza per il Clima Italia

Environmental organisations based in Germany
Environmental organizations established in 1990
1990 establishments in Germany
Climate change policy

References